Akania may refer to:
 Akania (plant), a genus of plants
 Akania, Dakshin Kachua, a village in the south of Kachua Upazila, Bangladesh
 Akania, Karaia, a village in the north of Kachua Upazila, Bangladesh